The following is a list of the monastic houses in Oxfordshire, England.

See also
 List of monastic houses in England

Notes

References

Medieval sites in England
 
Oxfordshire
Lists of buildings and structures in Oxfordshire
Oxfordshire